Athinon Avenue (also known as Kavalas Avenue) is an avenue linking  west of downtown Athens at Achilleos Street and Konstantinopouleos Avenue and the Piraeus interchange with the road linking Skaramagkas and Piraeus. For its entire length except for east of Kifissou for eastbound lanes, it is a part of GR-8 and GR-8A and the E94 south section west of Kifissou Avenue. The western section is lined with the historic Iera Odos. The Athens Industrial Area lies to the south.

History
The avenue became eight-laned in the 1950s and the 1960s westward and linked with the national road.  Later, the interchange with Kifissou Avenue was added and took months to complete; later the Thivon Avenue interchange was added, both with two exiting lanes and two left lanes for staying on Athinon Avenue to decongest traffic. Between 1991 and 1993, the eastbound interchange and westbound entrance with the Konstantinopouleos Avenue began construction and resulted to shut off parts of Athinon Avenue and Achilleos Streets.  The road detoured through Palamidou Street. It now avoids a railway crossing at which it congested traffic after its opening.  Construction between 1992 and 2000 did not affect the avenue but the interchange at the bottom. Another link with the Aegaleo Ring of the Attiki Odos was planned to be made in 2012 but remains unfinished to this day due to controversies.

Places
 Athens
 Aigaleo
 Peristeri
 Chaidari

Junctions
 1.5 km – Pallamidou and Patsis Streets
 3 km - Interchange with Kifissou Avenue
 3.5 km - residential street
 4 km - Interchange with Thivon Street
 5 km - road to Agia Varvara
 6th km - road to Peristeri
 8th km - street to Chaidari
 9th km - Iera Odos and second street to Chaidari
 10th km - Iera Odos
 12th km - Skaramagkas – end of Athinon Avenue, continuation of Athens-Corinth Road (GR-8 and GR-8A and E94)

References 

Streets in Athens